Verkhniye Lemezy (Ürge Lämäź) is a rural locality (a village) in Inzersky Selsoviet, Arkhangelsky District, Bashkortostan, Russia. The population was 105 as of 2010. There are 3 streets.

Geography 
Verkhniye Lemezy is located 46 km northeast of Arkhangelskoye (the district's administrative centre) by road. Verkhny Frolovsky is the nearest rural locality.

References 

Rural localities in Arkhangelsky District